Dan Jbara was a television and film producer whose career focused primarily on
the reality television field in the U.S.. He also executive-produced the 2008
short film thriller Trunk, starring Kyle Gallner and Zachery Bryan.

Early life and career
Jbara grew up in Westland, Michigan. He attended Wayne Memorial High School, Michigan State, and New York University Film School, intending to become a film director.  However, his career path took a different turn when he got a job at Fox News and encompassed the reality show genre.

Dan passed away on October 21, 2020 in Palm Springs, California.  He is survived by his mother and three siblings: a sister, Judy, and two brothers, Greg, and Mike.

Television career
 Producer - South Beach Classics - Velocity - originally seen on Discovery Channel (2011)
 Executive Producer - Is It Possible - Discovery Channel (2010)
 Executive Producer - Decision House - MyNetworkTV (2007)
 Executive Producer - The Greg Behrendt Show - Syndicated, from Sony Pictures Television (2006)
 Executive Producer - In Search of the Partridge Family (2004)
 Producer (Supervising, Co-Executive, Executive); Writer - Ripley's Believe It or Not! - TBS  (1999–2003)
 Executive Producer - Worst Case Scenarios (TV series) - TBS (2002)
 Co-Executive Producer - AXN-TV - Fox Family Channel (1998–1999)
 Producer - Hard Copy - Paramount Television (1989–1993, 1997–1999)
 Producer - The Mickey Mouse Club - Disney Channel (1993)
 Producer - A Current Affair - Fox (1986–1990)
 Segment Producer - Entertainment Tonight, NBA Entertainment, Special Report TV

Jbara also has segment-produced news shows at various Fox stations.

Jbara worked on the telecasts for the Emmy Awards (1988), Night of 100 Stars II, Liberty Weekend (1986), and the Tony Awards (1985).

Film career
 Executive Producer - Trunk (2008)
 Electric Press Kit Producer - The Last Seduction (1994)
 Electric Press Kit Producer - Blame It on the Bell Boy (1992)

Awards and nominations
 Aldo Award for Outstanding Directing in Fashion Journalism (1994)
 CableACE nomination for Outstanding Children's Program (1994)

References

External links

American television producers
Living people
Businesspeople from Detroit
Michigan State University alumni
Tisch School of the Arts alumni
Year of birth missing (living people)